Javorište (Serbian Cyrillic: Јавориште) is a mountain in eastern Serbia, near the town of Resavica. Its highest peak Oštri kamen has an elevation of 1,213 meters above sea level. It is part of wider Kučaj mountain system, which belongs to Serbian Carpathians range.

References

Mountains of Serbia